Edward Frederick Anderson (Covina, California, June 17, 1932 – March 29, 2001) was an American botanist who conducted extensive explorations in Mexico.

He was a leading specialist in the cactus family. He was Senior Research Botanist at the Desert Botanical Garden, Phoenix. He chaired the International Organization for Succulent Plant Study. He was a member of the Cactus and Succulent Society of America and the Linnean Society of London. He was emeritus professor of biology at Whitman College, where he taught for three decades.

In 1998 Dr. Anderson was awarded the prestigious Cactus d'Or, given by the principality of Monaco for outstanding research on succulents.

Books
 Peyote: The Divine Cactus. University of Arizona Press, Tucson 1981, 
 Plants and People of the Golden Triangle: Ethnobotany of the Hill Tribes of Northern Thailand. Dioscorides Press, Portland (Oregon) 1993, 
 Threatened Cacti of Mexico. Balogh Scientific Books, Kew 1994,  con Salvador Arias & Nigel P. Taylor
 The Cactus Family. Timber Press, Portland (Oregon) 2001,

Further reading
Gideon F. Smith, Liz A. Slauson. "Edward F. (Ted) Anderson (1932–2001): One of the Greatest Students of Cactaceae of the 20th Century". En: Taxon 50 ( 3): 939–942

References

1932 births
2001 deaths
Botanists active in North America
Fellows of the Linnean Society of London
People from Covina, California
Scientists from California
20th-century American botanists